Cees Keizer (born 8 January 1986) is a Dutch former professional footballer who played as a midfielder. He currently works as a youth coach with FC Volendam.

Career
Born in Volendam, Keizer played youth football with hometown club FC Volendam before moving to Dutch giants Ajax. He never broke into the first team, and moved to Vitesse, where he made his professional debut in the 2007–08 season. He moved on loan to FC Zwolle in January 2009, before signing a permanent contract in June 2009. Keizer remained a player of Zwolle for a year and a half, after which he left for FC Oss. In 2012, he started playing for his youth club RKAV Volendam. 

After his retirement in 2017, Cees started his coaching career at RKAV Volendam. There, he coached the U11 team for three consecutive years and later began working as a youth coach for FC Volendam. He became a UEFA A Youth coach in June 2020.

References

External links
  Player profile at Voetbal International

1986 births
Living people
Dutch footballers
FC Volendam players
AFC Ajax players
SBV Vitesse players
PEC Zwolle players
TOP Oss players
Eredivisie players
Eerste Divisie players
People from Volendam
Association football midfielders
FC Volendam non-playing staff
Footballers from North Holland